Lea Sophie Friedrich (born 7 January 2000) is a German professional track cyclist. In October 2019, she won the silver medal in the women's team sprint event at the 2019 UEC European Track Championships.

Major results

2017 
National Junior Track Cycling Championships
1st  500m Time Trial
1st  Keirin
1st  Individual Sprint
2nd Team Sprint
UCI Junior Track Cycling World Championships
2nd 500m Time Trial
2nd Team Sprint
3rd Individual Sprint
European Junior Track Cycling Championships
2nd Team Sprint
2nd Individual Sprint
2nd 500m Time Trial

2018
UCI Junior Track Cycling World Championships
1st  500m Time Trial
1st  Keirin
2nd Team Sprint
3rd Individual Sprint
1st  Team Sprint, National Track Cycling Championships
National Junior Track Cycling Championships
1st  500m Time Trial
1st  Keirin
1st  Individual Sprint
1st  Team Sprint

2019 
European U23 Track Cycling Championships
1st  500m Time Trial 
1st  Keirin
2nd Individual Sprint
European Track Cycling Championships
2nd Team Sprint
2nd Keirin
3rd Individual Sprint
UCI Track Cycling World Cup
Team Sprint – Minsk
Team Sprint – Glasgow

2020 
UCI Track Cycling World Championships
1st  500m Time Trial
1st  Team Sprint
European U23 Track Cycling Championships
1st  500m Time Trial 
1st  Keirin
1st  Individual Sprint
1st  Team Sprint

References

External links
 

2000 births
Living people
German female cyclists
Cyclists from Mecklenburg-Western Pomerania
UCI Track Cycling World Champions (women)
Olympic cyclists of Germany
Cyclists at the 2020 Summer Olympics
Medalists at the 2020 Summer Olympics
Olympic silver medalists for Germany
Olympic medalists in cycling
People from Nordwestmecklenburg
21st-century German women